Nostradameus was a Swedish power metal band from Gothenburg. They were formed in 1998 and disbanded in 2010. Their latest release is Illusion's Parade.

Members

Current 
Freddy Persson – vocals
Jake Fredén – guitar
Lennart Specht – guitar
Thomas Antonsson – bass
Esko Salow – drums

Former 
Michael Åberg – guitar
Erik Söderman – guitar
Gustav Nahlin – drums
Jesse Lindskog – drums

Timeline

Discography 
Words of Nostradameus (2000)
The Prophet of Evil (2001)
The Third Prophecy (2003)
Hellbound (2004)
Pathway (2007)
Illusion's Parade (2009)

References

External links 
 Nostradameus at MySpace
 

Swedish power metal musical groups
Musical groups established in 1998